Lü Hongxiang (born March 27, 1960) is a former Chinese international footballer who represented Tianjin before moving to Japan where he had spells at Fujitsu F.C. and Tokyo Gas, while internationally he represented China in the 1984 Asian Cup.

Biography
Lu Hongxiang started his career in the 1979 Chinese league season with Tianjin, where he showed he was capable of playing as a left midfielder, wingback or striker. The following season, he quickly established himself as one of the most skillful players in China and was part of the team that won the 1980 league title. This then saw him called up to the Chinese national team, where he was included in the squads that took part in the 1982 Asian Games and 1984 AFC Asian Cup where China came runners-up. By 1987 he had the chance to move abroad with Japanese side Fujitsu F.C. before ending his career with Tokyo Gas.

Career statistics

International statistics

Honours
Tianjin
Chinese Jia-A League: 1980

References

External links
Team China Stats

1960 births
Living people
Chinese footballers
Footballers from Tianjin
China international footballers
Tianjin Jinmen Tiger F.C. players
Expatriate footballers in Japan
Japan Soccer League players
Kawasaki Frontale players
FC Tokyo players
1984 AFC Asian Cup players
Footballers at the 1986 Asian Games
Association football utility players
Asian Games competitors for China